Oriol Pamies (born October 17, 1989) is a Spanish entrepreneur, LGBT activist and tourism expert, known for co-founding LGBT social network, Moovz and Queer Destinations.

Early life
Pamies was born in Reus, Catalonia. In 2008, he moved to Barcelona for his studies, which he dropped when he started to pursue his entrepreneurial career.

In 2012, following an invitation from Idan Matalon, Pamies travelled to Israel to explore new business opportunities.

Career

Moovz and LGBT activism
Pamies joined the Israeli start-up Interacting Technology as their VP Business Development becoming one of the founders of Moovz, an LGBT social network. While in Israel he became an active member of the local LGBT and tech community.

In 2016, Pamies partnered with YouTuber Julio Jaramillo and Juana Martinez in a campaign to defend diversity and tolerance. In 2017, Pamies led Moovz to become the official social network of Madrid World Pride 2017 2017.

Pamies has taken part in various conferences, presenting topics related to entrepreneurship, online marketing and activism.

Tourism industry
Through Moovz, Pamies works to position tourist destinations as LGBT friendly. In 2015 and through a partnership with Tel Aviv Municipality, he was behind a project that broadcast through the app the Tel Aviv Pride Parade. In 2016, he advocated and promoted Israel through an interview at the Spanish magazine Shangay. In May 2017, during the annual convention of International Gay and Lesbian Travel Association (IGLTA) in St. Petersburg, Florida, he delivered the first keynote in Spanish. In September 2017 in Bogotá, he took part at the International Congress of Social Mobility and Right to the city, organised by the City Hall, where he presented a case study on how the Gay Pride Parade can contribute at the positioning and International promotion of a city as an LGBT friendly destination.

In 2018, he joined the board of directors of the International Gay and Lesbian Travel Association (IGLTA), a non-profit organization with 37 years of history dedicated to promoting LGBTQ+ tourism worldwide. He also created and organized Open Sea Cruise, a 7-day LGBTQ+ event in a cruise ship with over 1200 people from more than 54 countries joined by artists like Icona Pop, Vengaboys, Kazaky, Eleni Foureira, Conchita Wurst, and RuPaul. The cruise was focused on wellness, fitness and pop music parties and visited cities like Ibiza, Barcelona, Toulon and Ajaccio.

In 2019, he founded Queer Destinations, a company focused on the promotion of LGBTQ+ tourism, developing an international tourism certification. The IGLTA and Queer Destinations signed an agreement with the Secretary of Tourism, Miguel Torruco Marqués, to promote the tourist promotion oriented to the LGBTI segment in Mexico. That same year, Pamies also developed and launched an LGBT tourism pilot program in Mexico, initially running the program in Yucatán state.

Publications
In 2019, Pamies published his first book, Ahora Que Ya Lo Sabes (Now You Know) with Dome Publishing, which describes his personal story though while dealing with topics as orientation, identity, and gender expression, prejudice, homophobia, acceptance, the process of coming out of the closet, and activism., to help readers make decisions, and to let those who are suffering for being different come to recognize that they are perfect just as they are.It was presented at the 2019 Madrid Pride.

Personal life
Pamies is gay and has expressed his desire to have kids in several occasions. He had spent most of his adolescent years studying at an Opus Dei school, but left when he started to question his sexuality and decided to come out as gay at the age of 19. As a result, Pamies has been a strong promoter of October 11 as National Coming Out Day.

Pamies has been in a committed relationship with Alejandro Quesada (born 1997) since 2019.

Awards and recognition
In 2017, MTV invited Pamies to take part in the project Out in 60, a project where celebrities and influencers shared their coming out story in 60 seconds. According to the Spanish portal Cromosoma X, Pamies is one of the most important LGBT influencers of the moment in 2017.

In 2017, he was revealed as one of the "top 20 bachelors of the year" by Attitude Magazine.

References

1989 births
Gay entertainers
Spanish LGBT entertainers
Spanish gay men
LGBT producers
Spanish LGBT rights activists
Gay businessmen
Living people
People from Barcelona
Spanish businesspeople